Clathrodrillia berryi is a species of sea snail, a marine gastropod mollusk in the family Drilliidae.

Description

Distribution
This species occurs in the Pacific Ocean along Panama.

References

 McLean & Poorman, 1971. New species of Tropical Eastern Pacific Turridae; The Veliger, 14, 89–113

External links
 
 BioLib : Clathrodrillia berryi

berryi
Gastropods described in 1971